The Monmouth County Horse Show has been running since 1895 and is now located in Freehold, New Jersey.

History
The 1913 show was in Long Branch, New Jersey and was attended by James Fairman Fielder, the New Jersey Governor.

See also
Morristown Field Club

References

External links
Monmouth County Horse Show from the Library of Congress at Flickr

Tourist attractions in Monmouth County, New Jersey
1895 establishments in New Jersey
Agricultural shows in the United States
Equestrian venues in the United States
Freehold Borough, New Jersey